Irina Petrovna Gribko (born 16 January 1969) is a retired Soviet rower who won a silver medal in the eights at the 1991 World Championships. Next year her team finished fourth in this event at the 1992 Summer Olympics. She later competed for Belarus and won a bronze medal in the coxless fours at the 1995 World Championships.

References

1969 births
Living people
Olympic rowers of the Unified Team
Rowers at the 1992 Summer Olympics
Soviet female rowers
World Rowing Championships medalists for the Soviet Union
World Rowing Championships medalists for Belarus